Obesotoma tumida is a species of sea snail, a marine gastropod mollusk in the family Mangeliidae.

Description
The length of the shell varies between 10 mm and 13 mm.

Distribution
This marine species occurs off Western Greenland; Eastern Siberia, and the Laptev Sea, Russia

References

 Kantor, Y.I. & Sysoev, A.V. (eds), 2005. Catalogue of molluscs of Russia and adjacent countries. Moscow

External links
  Tucker, J.K. 2004 Catalog of recent and fossil turrids (Mollusca: Gastropoda). Zootaxa 682:1–1295.

tumida
Gastropods described in 1898